The shaggy bat (Centronycteris maximiliani) is a bat species from northern South America.  It appears to be a slow flier and has a rather regular pattern of foraging in its home range, a feature shared with other emballonurids. It is an aerial insectivore.

References

Bats of South America
Bats of Brazil
Mammals of Colombia
Centronycteris
Shaggy bat
Shaggy bat